The 2000 Houston Cougars baseball team represented the University of Houston in the 2000 intercollegiate baseball season. Houston competed in Division I of the National Collegiate Athletic Association (NCAA) in its fourth season as a member of Conference USA. The Cougars played home games at Cougar Field on the university's campus in Houston, Texas. Sixth-year head coach Rayner Noble, a former pitcher for the team during the 1980 through 1983 seasons and an assistant coach from 1987 through 1990, led the Cougars.

Upon winning the inaugural Conference USA Tournament, Houston entered the 2000 NCAA Division I baseball tournament for the thirteenth time in school history.  They hosted the Houston Regional, where they defeated Rice to advance to the super regional round for the first time in school history.  Although hosting the Houston Super Regional, they were defeated by San Jose State in a three-game series.

References

External links
 

Houston Cougars baseball seasons
Houston
Houston
Houston